The kinship terms of Hindustani (Hindi-Urdu) differ from the English system in certain respects. In the Hindustani system, kin terms are based on gender, and the difference between some terms is the degree of respect. Moreover, "In Hindi and Urdu kinship terms there is clear distinction between the blood relations and affinal relations."

Relations

Paternal
Pardada	(परदादा, پردادا)	- One's father's father's father (One's paternal great-grandfather)
 
Pardadi	(परदादी, پردادی)	- One's father's father's mother (One's paternal great-grandmother)

Dada (दादा, دادا)		- One's father's father (One's paternal grandfather), One's uncle (usually elder brother of father)

Dadi (दादी, دادی)		- One's father's mother (One's paternal grandmother)

Papa (पापा, پاپا)		- One's father

Pitaji (पिताजी, پتاجی)	- One's father (used mainly by the Hindu community)

Abba/Baba (अब्बा/बाबा, بابا/ابا)	- One's father (used mainly by the Muslim community)

Kaka - One's father's younger brother

Kaki- One's father's younger brother's wife (by marriage)

Chāchā (चाचा, چاچا)	- One's father's younger brother

Chachā (चचा, چچا)	- One's father's younger brother

Chachi (चाची, چاچی)	- One's father's brother's wife

Tau (ताऊ, تاُّو)   	- One's father's elder brother

Taya (ताया, تایا)        - One's father's elder brother

Barka Abba              - One's father's elder brother (used mainly by the Muslim community)

Bare Papa (बड़े पापा, بڑے پاپا) - One's father's elder brother

Tai (ताई, تائی)	          - One's father's elder brother's wife

Bari Ma	(बड़ी माँ, بڑی ماں)  - One's father's elder brother's wife

Bua (बुआ, بوا)           - One's father's sister

Phuphi (फूफी, پھپی)        - One's father's sister

Phupha (फूफा, پھوپا)        - One's father's sister's husband

Maternal
Parnana (परनाना, پرنانا) 	- One's mother's father's father

Parnani	(परनानी, پرنانی) - One's mother's father's mother

Nana (नाना, نانا)  	        - One's mother's father

Nani (नानी, نانی)  	        - One's mother's mother

Ma/Amma/Ammi (माँ/अंबा/माताश्री/मातृ, ماں) 	         - One's mother

Mausi/Mausiya (मौसी,  موسی) 	        - One's mother's sister (used mainly by the Hindu community)

Khala/Barki Amma                - One's mother's elder sister (used by the Muslim community)

Mausa (मौसा, موسا) 	        - One's mother's sister's husband (used mainly by the Hindu community)

Mama (मामा, ماما)	        - One's mother's brother

Mami (मामी, مامی)	        - One's mother's brother's wife

Siblings 
Bhai (भाई, بھائی) / Bhaiya (भैया, بھئيا)   - One's parent's (share at least one parent) son (your Brother, male sibling)

Behen (बहन, بہیں) 	- One's parent's (share at least one parent) daughter (your younger Sister, female sibling)

Didi (दीदी, دیدی)	- One's parent's (share at least one parent) daughter (your elder Sister, female sibling)

Brother's family 
Bhabhi (भाबी, بھابی) - Brother's wife (usually applied for an elder brother's wife)

Bhatija (भतीजा,بھتیجا) - One's brother's son

Bhatiji (भतीजी, بھتیجی) - One's brother's daughter

Sister's family 
Jija (जीजा, جیجا) - Sister's husband (usually applied for an elder sister's husband)

Bhanja (भांजा, بھانجا) - One's sister's son

Bhanji (भांजी, بھانجی) - One's sister's daughter

Individual's family 
Main (मैं, میں) - First form ('I')

Patni (पत्नी, پتنی) - One's wife (used mainly by the Hindu community)

Biwi (बीवी, بیوی)    - One's wife

Pati (पति, پتی)    - One's husband (used mainly by the Hindu community)

Khavind (ख़ाविंद, خاوند) - One's husband (used mainly by the Muslim community)

Beta (बेटा, بیٹا)	- One's son

Beti (बेटी, بیٹی) 	- One's daughter

Pota (पोता/परपुत्र, پوتا) - Son's son

Poti (पोती/परपुत्री, پوتی) - Son's daughter

Naati/Dohtaa (नाती/दोहता/परपुत्र) - Daughter's son (used mainly by the Hindu community)

Naatin/Dohtii (नातिन/दोहती/परपुत्री) - Daughter's daughter (used mainly by the Hindu community)

Nawaasa (نواسہ नवासा) - Daughter's son (used mainly by the Muslim community)
 
Nawaasi (نواسی नवासी) - Daughter's daughter (used mainly by the Muslim community)

In-Laws
Sasur (ससुर, سسُر)  - One's husband's/wife's father (Father-in-Law)

Sas (सास, ساس) - One's husband's/Wife's mother (Mother-in-Law)

Damad (दामाद) - One's son-in-law

Bahu (बहू,بہو) - One's daughter-in-law

See also 

Hindustani etymology
Hindustani grammar
Hindustani orthography
Hindustani phonology
Hindi-Urdu vocabulary

References

External links 

North Indian Relationship Terms
Family Relations in Hindi/Urdu - Syracuse University
Meva Turizm
Boltidictionary-Family members in Hindi/Urdu with audio files

Kinship terminology
Family in India
Hindi words and phrases
Urdu-language words and phrases
Hindustani language